Marc Schoetter (23 October 1889 – 27 April 1955) was a Luxembourgian bobsledder. He competed in the four-man event at the 1928 Winter Olympics.

References

1889 births
1955 deaths
Luxembourgian male bobsledders
Olympic bobsledders of Luxembourg
Bobsledders at the 1928 Winter Olympics
People from Bettembourg